Cenizas y diamantes (English title: Ashes & diamonds) is a Mexican telenovela produced by Eugenio Cobo for Televisa in 1990. The story is inspired by the story of Cinderella.

It starred Ernesto Laguardia and Lola Merino, with Sergio Bustamante, Guillermo Murray, Silvia Mariscal and Héctor Ortega.

Cast 
 Ernesto Laguardia as Julián Gallardo
 Lola Merino as Celeste Ortiz
 Sergio Bustamante as Dámaso Gallardo
 Guillermo Murray as Felipe Ortiz
 Silvia Mariscal as Andrea de Ortiz
 Héctor Ortega as Gabino Ortiz
 Marta Aura as Amparo del Bosque
 Irlanda Mora as Emma
 Elizabeth Dupeyrón as Sor Fátima
 Alejandra Procuna as Cynthia Ortiz
 Elizabeth Ávila as Bárbara Ortiz
 Germán Bernal as Pepe
 Raúl Magaña as Freddy
 Sergio Sánchez as Manuel
 Juan Antonio Aspe as Néstor Gallardo
 Evelyn Solares as Madre Superiora
 Eugenio Cobo as Tomás
 Ricardo de Pascual Jr.
 Genoveva Pérez as Antonia
 Joaquín Garrido as Garnica
 Luis Tenorio Vega as Abogado
 Humberto Yáñez as Abulón
 Gustavo Aguilar as Manotas
 Gustavo Cuevas as Tractor
 Jorge Alberto Bolaños as Benjamín
 Luz Adriana as Refugio
 Graciela Bernardos as Escalante
 Joana Brito as Arévalo
 Maru Dueñas as Cuquín
 Georgina Pedret as Rita
 Fernando Colunga
 Xavier Ximénez
 Julio Barquin

Awards

References

External links 
 

1990 telenovelas
Mexican telenovelas
1990 Mexican television series debuts
1991 Mexican television series endings
Spanish-language telenovelas
Television shows set in Mexico City
Televisa telenovelas